The Boat Race is a side-by-side rowing competition between the men's senior boat clubs of the University of Oxford (sometimes referred to as the "Dark Blues") and the University of Cambridge (sometimes referred to as the "Light Blues").  The race was first held in 1829 on a  stretch of the River Thames.  As of 2015 the race takes place on the  Championship Course, between Putney and Mortlake on the Thames in south-west London. The rivalry is a major point of honour between the two universities; it is followed throughout the United Kingdom and broadcast worldwide.  Four unofficial boat races were held during the Second World War, both on the Thames and the Great Ouse in Ely.  The crews were not recognised as full Blues and as such, the results of these races are not included in the official tally.

As of the 2022 race, Cambridge lead overall in the competition with 85 victories to Oxford's 81; the 1877 race was declared a "dead heat".  Cambridge have led Oxford in cumulative wins since 1930.

The reserve crews of Oxford and Cambridge University Boat Clubs have also raced against one another since 1967.  Oxford's boat Isis (named after The Isis, a section of the Thames which flows through Oxford) and Cambridge's boat Goldie (named after former Cambridge boat club president John Goldie) compete on The Championship Course, usually on the same day as the main Boat Race.  As at 2021, Cambridge's reserve crew have the overall lead with 32 victories to Oxford's 24.



Results

The first race, held in 1829, took place on a  stretch of the Thames between Hambleden Lock and Henley Bridge. It was officially recorded that Oxford won the race "easily".  Seven years passed before the second race, which Cambridge won by 20 lengths, along a  course between Westminster Bridge and Putney Bridge.  A further four races, three of which were won by the Light Blues, took place along the same course.  The 1845 race was the first to be conducted on The Championship Course, the same course in use as of the 2015 race, and was won by Cambridge by ten lengths.  Having won the ninth Boat Race "easily", Cambridge led 7–2 overall, and were challenged, for the first and only time, to a second race in the same year.  Oxford were victorious as the Light Blues were disqualified, the only time that event that the race was decided in such a manner.

The 1859 race was the first in which one of the crews sank: Cambridge's crew were variously rescued or swam to the shore, while Oxford took the overall record to 9–7 in Cambridge's favour.  Between the 1861 and 1869 race, Oxford made a then-record streak of nine consecutive victories; Cambridge won the next five and were 16–15 ahead after the 1874 race.  A dead heat in the 1877 race is the only time in the event that such an official result has been given. Cambridge won four consecutive races between 1886 and 1889, to which Oxford responded with a then record-equalling streak of nine consecutive victories, with Oxford leading the overall record 32–22.  Cambridge won the 1900 race by 20 lengths, the largest margin of victory of the races contested on The Championship Course. The 1912 race saw both boats sink, so a re-row was ordered two days later which Oxford won.

Cambridge won the last race before the First World War suspended the event for five years. The Light Blues won in 1920, 1921 and 1922 before Oxford triumphed in the 1923 race. Cambridge subsequently won thirteen consecutive races from 1924 to lead 47–40 overall by 1936. Another hiatus, this time six years long, was caused by the Second World War, after which the Light Blues won five of the next six races. A streak of six wins saw Cambridge 16 wins ahead overall after the 1973 race. Oxford won seventeen of the next nineteen years, and were just a single victory behind after the 1992 race, the overall record 69–68 in Cambridge's favour. The Light Blues then won the following seven races, including setting the record time along The Championship Course of 16 minutes 19 seconds in the 1998 race. Their dominance faded, and the Dark Blues sealed victory in the 2000 race to trail overall by seven wins, 76–69. Cambridge won the 2021 race, taking the overall record to 85–80 in Cambridge's favour.

The overall record has been tied on just three occasions: following The Boat Race 1836, it was one victory each.  Oxford's third win in a row in the 1863 race took the record to 10–10, while Cambridge's sixth victory in a streak of thirteen wins between 1924 and 1936 tied the universities at 40–40.

Main race
All races from 1845 to 2019, and 2022 took place on The Championship Course.

 

 – race was held on a  stretch of the Thames between Hambleden Lock and Henley Bridge.

 – race was held on a  stretch of the Thames between Westminster Bridge and Putney Bridge.

 – race was held on a 3-mile (5 km)  stretch of the River Great Ouse.
 
a.  Cambridge (on the Surrey side) had initially gone into a clear lead, so that they were entitled to take Oxford's water on the Middlesex side. When the boats came up to Crabtree Tavern, Cambridge made for the Surrey side just as Oxford were about to overhaul them. Oxford refused to give way and the two boats collided. After a close fought race, Cambridge crossed the line first. Umpire Fellows called a foul citing the rule in the code of rowing laws governing collisions after one boat has taken the others' water: "if they come into contact by the leading boat's departing from the water so taken, the leading boat shall be deemed to have committed a foul".

b.  In the first race, both boats sank, so it was restaged two days later.

c.  The race was interrupted and restarted. The crews collided and an Oxford oar broke in half and the crews continued. Finish judge Ben Kent counted the total time spent racing.

Unofficial wartime races

During the Second World War, four races were organised at various locations, although full Blues were not awarded to the participants. In 1940, a race was held at Henley along a  course which Cambridge won. A race organised in 1941 fell through and in 1942 Oxford were unable to provide a crew. In 1943, a race took place at Sandford-on-Thames in front of a crowd estimated to be between 7,000 and 10,000, where Oxford's experience of the course helped them to a narrow win.  The following year, the contest was held at the Adelaide course in Ely, with Oxford winning, this time by three-quarters of a length. The final unofficial race was held, again, at Henley, along the Regatta course, which Cambridge won by two lengths. The overall record in the unofficial wartime races ended 2–2.

Reserves race
The men's reserves race is contested between Oxford's Isis and Cambridge's Goldie.  The first race was held in 1965 with Oxford's reserves taking the inaugural victory. Goldie have two eight-year winning streaks (from 1967 to 1974 and from 1990 to 1997), while Isis' best run is seven wins in a row from the 2011 to the 2017 race.  As of the 2021 race, Goldie lead 32–24 overall.

a.  When the crews were approaching Barnes Bridge, Isis were leading by about  length. Umpire John Garrett had warned Isis for being out of their water, when a further blade clash resulted in the Goldie no. 2 breaking his swivel. Garrett then disqualified Isis.

See also
Women's Boat Race

References
Notes

Bibliography

Results
Rowing-related lists
England-related lists